The Fusco Brothers is an American gag-a-day comic strip created by J. C. Duffy which features the four Fusco bachelors — Rölf, Lance, Al, and Lars — along with Lance's girlfriend, Gloria, and Axel, the Fuscos' wolverine. The strip has been nationally syndicated since 1989.

Collections
"Come Here Often?" Bad Pickup Lines and Other Dating Atrocities from the Fusco Brothers  (Paperback - Jan 2000 - ASIN B0025UMWU4)
Virtual Banality: A Fusco Brothers Collection (Paperback - Aug 1996 - )
Cruel and Unusual: A Fusco Brothers Collection  (Paperback - Sep 1995 - )
Newark and Reality...Together Again: A Harsh Dose of The Fusco Brothers (Paperback - Sep 1992)
Meet the Fusco Brothers  (Paperback - Oct 1990)

External links
Home page for J. C. Duffy
The Fusco Brothers at GoComics.com

1989 comics debuts
American comic strips
Comic strips set in the United States
Comics characters introduced in 1989
Fictional families
Gag-a-day comics
Male characters in comics
Works about brothers